Little Malvern Priory, in the village of Little Malvern near Malvern, Worcestershire, was a Benedictine monastery c. 1171–1537. It was founded from Worcester Cathedral. Little remains of the 12th-century church, which was rebuilt in 1480–1482. The site is now occupied by house named Little Malvern Court, which has limited public opening. The present building comprises a medieval chancel and crossing tower, and a modern west porch on the site of the east bays of the nave. The transepts and the two chapels flanking the choir are in ruins. The grade I listed Little Malvern Priory church, dedicated to St Giles, is adjacent.

See Abbeys and priories in England for a complete list of English abbeys and priories. National Grid reference: SO770404.

See also
List of English abbeys, priories and friaries serving as parish churches

Notes

References
 Pevsner, Sir Nikolaus, Worcestershire; The Buildings of England, Penguin Books, Middlesex (1977); /

External links

 Corpus of Romanesque Sculpture in Britain and Ireland
 Little Malvern Court - visiting information

Buildings and structures completed in 1482
Christian monasteries established in the 12th century
Monasteries in Worcestershire
Benedictine monasteries in England
Buildings and structures in Malvern, Worcestershire
Church of England church buildings in Worcestershire
Historic house museums in Worcestershire
Religious museums in England
1170s establishments in England
1537 disestablishments in England
Little Malvern